According to the International Energy Agency, France has historically generated a very low level of carbon dioxide emissions  compared to other G7 economies due to its reliance on nuclear energy. Energy in France is generated from five primary sources: coal, natural gas, liquid fuels, nuclear power, and renewables. In 2020, nuclear power made up the largest portion of electricity generation, at around 78%.
Renewables accounted for 19.1% of energy consumption.  France has the largest share of nuclear electricity in the world. The country is also among the world's biggest net exporters of electricity. The country is increasingly investing in renewable energy and has set a target of 32% by 2030.

In its 2021 Country report on France, the International Energy Agency warned that the country is recording delays in terms of meetings its own energy and climate goals. The  IEA pointed to the rising level of carbon emissions due to the reliance on fossil fuels in transport in particular and to concerns related to the aging nuclear fleet.

Overview

Mtoe = 11.63 TWh, Prim. energy includes energy losses that are 2/3 for nuclear power 2012R = CO2 calculation criteria changed, numbers updated

Electricity

The electricity sector in France is dominated by nuclear power, which accounted for 72.3% of total production in 2016, while renewables and fossil fuels accounted for 17.8% and 8.6%, respectively. France has the largest share of nuclear electricity in the world. The country is also among the world's biggest net exporters of electricity. The French nuclear power sector is almost entirely owned by the French government and the degree of the government subsidy is difficult to ascertain because of a lack of transparency.

In 2010, as part of the progressive liberalisation of the energy market under EU directives, France agreed the Accès régulé à l'électricité nucléaire historique (ARENH) regulations that allowed third party suppliers access up to about a quarter of France's pre-2011 nuclear generation capacity, at a fixed price of €42/MWh from 1 July 2011 until 31 December 2025.

Companies

Électricité de France (EDF) is the main electricity generation and distribution company in France. It was founded on 8 April 1946 as a result of the nationalisation of a number of electricity producers, transporters and distributors by the Communist Minister of Industrial Production Marcel Paul. Until 19 November 2004 it was a government corporation, but it is now a limited-liability corporation under private law (société anonyme). The French government partially floated shares of the company on the Paris Stock Exchange in November 2005, although it retained almost 85% ownership at the end of 2007.

EDF held a monopoly in the distribution, but not the production, of electricity in France until 1999, when the first European Union directive to harmonize regulation of electricity markets was implemented.

EDF is one of the world's largest producers of electricity. In 2003, it produced 22% of the European Union's electricity, primarily from nuclear power:
nuclear: 74.5%
hydro-electric: 16.3%
thermal: 9.1%
wind power and other renewable sources: 0.1%

A report was published in 2011 by the World Energy Council in association with Oliver Wyman, entitled Policies for the future: 2011 Assessment of country energy and climate policies, which ranks country performance according to an energy sustainability index. The best performers were Switzerland, Sweden, and France.

Renewable energy 

With growing installed wind and solar power capacity, on top of preexisting hydroelectric facilities, renewable energy rose to provide 23% of France's national electricity consumption in 2019.

Government policy aims to increase renewable energy use; in 2015, the French parliament passed a comprehensive energy and climate law that includes a mandatory renewable energy target requiring 40% of national electricity production to come from renewable sources by 2030. A related provision of the 2015 law was the planned reduction of nuclear energy's share in power production from 75% (2016-2017 data) to 50% by 2025, but this was later delayed by ten years, to 2035, over concerns of carbon emissions, energy security, and employment.

See also 

 Electricity sector in France
 Nuclear power in France
 Renewable energy in France
 Électricité de France (EDF)

References

 
France